Umm Haram is a female companion of Muhammad.

Hala Sultan may also refer to:
 Hala Sultan Tekke, a mosque in Cyprus